Joan Tardà i Coma (born 26 September 1953) is a Catalan teacher and politician from Spain. He is a former member of the Congress of Deputies of Spain.

Early life and family
Tardà was born on 26 September 1953 in Cornellà de Llobregat, Catalonia. He is the son a bricklayer and a cinema ticket seller from Cornellà de Llobregat. From the age of twelve Tardà worked at the same cinema as his mother. He has a Master of Arts degree.

Tardà was a member of Red Flag until 1974. He was a member of the Unified Socialist Party of Catalonia (PSUC) from 1974 to 1976 when he joined the newly formed Left Nationalists (NE). Following the dissolution of NE Tardà joined the Republican Left of Catalonia (ERC) and was president of its Cornellà branch from 1996 to 1999. He was also a member of Assemblea de Batlles and the Committee of Solidarity with the Catalan Patriots (Comitès de Solidaritat amb els Patriotes Catalans).

Career
Tardà and other teachers taught Catalan after school as the Fascist Francoist dictatorship had banned the teaching of Catalan in schools. He has taught Catalan language and literature at the IES Institut Esteve Terradas secondary school since 1980.

Tardà was elected to Cornellà de Llobregat Municipal Council at the 1979 local election as an independent PSUC candidate, serving until 1983. He contested the 1999 local elections as a Republican Left of Catalonia-Acord Municipal (ERC-AM) electoral alliance candidate in Cornellà and was re-elected. He was re-elected at the 2003 local election. He resigned in September 2004.

Tardà contested the 2004 general election as an ERC candidate in the Province of Barcelona and was elected to the Congress of Deputies. He was re-elected at the 2008, 2011, 2015 and 2016 general elections.

In March 2019 Tardà announced that he would not seek re-election at the next general election and would quit national politics. At the 2019 general election Tardà was placed 32nd on the Republican Left of Catalonia–Sovereigntists electoral alliance's list of candidates in the Province of Barcelona but the alliance only managed to win eight seats in the province and as a result he failed to get re-elected to the Congress of Deputies.

Personal life
Tardà's partner Empar Fernández is a history teacher. They have two children.

Electoral history

References

1953 births
Communists from Catalonia
Educators from Catalonia
Living people
Members of the 8th Congress of Deputies (Spain)
Members of the 9th Congress of Deputies (Spain)
Members of the 10th Congress of Deputies (Spain)
Members of the 11th Congress of Deputies (Spain)
Members of the 12th Congress of Deputies (Spain)
Municipal councillors in the province of Barcelona
People from Cornellà de Llobregat
Republican Left of Catalonia politicians